Sunnybank State High School is a Queensland Government State School located in the suburb of Sunnybank, approximately 15 kilometres south of the city of Brisbane, in Queensland, Australia. The school has its predominant frontage on Turton Street and is also bordered by Gager and Boorman Streets. This block is shared with the Sunnybank Bowls Club and a scout hall. The school was opened in 1963, making it one of the oldest schools in the district.

Uniform 
In 2003, the School uniform at Sunnybank High changed with the arrival of a new principal. A new sports uniform consisting of teal green with the addition of vertical black, yellow and white lines replaced the original green and white previously used. The new formal uniform appeared as a white dress shirt and striped tie in accordance with the new school colours, in conjunction with black shorts and long pants for males. Female uniforms also required the use of a shorter tie, white dress shirt and light green skirts. The new formal uniform replaced the previous uniform composed of either green shirts with grey shorts or white dress shirts with black pants and green tie for males, and green and white striped dress shirts and black pants or green skirt for females.

The school is located in a highly multicultural area.

See also 
 List of schools in Queensland

External links
 Sunnybank State High School website

Public high schools in Brisbane
Educational institutions established in 1963
1963 establishments in Australia